The following is a list of notable deaths in August 2022.

Entries for each day are listed alphabetically by surname. A typical entry lists information in the following sequence:
 Name, age, country of citizenship at birth, subsequent country of citizenship (if applicable), reason for notability, cause of death (if known), and reference.

August 2022

1
Lennart Back, 89, Swedish Olympic race walker (1960).
Trevor Baines, 82, British businessman and convicted fraudster.
Carlos Blixen, 85, Uruguayan basketball player, Olympic bronze medallist (1956).
Jack Bowman, 90, American politician, member of the Tennessee House of Representatives (1967–1976).
Rosa de Castilla, 90, Mexican singer and actress (The Unknown Mariachi, Yo... el aventurero, Héroe a la fuerza).
Tom Cornell, 88, American peace activist and newspaper editor (Catholic Worker).
Doc Dockery, 89, American businessman and author.
Milan Đuričić, 60, Serbian football manager (Vojvodina, Inđija, Radnički Niš).
Paul Eenhoorn, 73, Australian-born American actor (This Is Martin Bonner, Land Ho!, Viper Club), heart attack.
Teresa Ferenc, 88, Polish poet.
Hugo Fernández, 77, Uruguayan football player (Nacional, Puebla) and manager (Consadole Sapporo).
John Fielding, 82, English footballer (Brentford, Southport, Grimsby Town).
Mikhail Golovatov, 72, Russian intelligence officer (KGB).
John Hughes, 79, Scottish football player (Celtic, national team) and manager (Stranraer).
Anastasiya Kobzarenko, 88, Ukrainian director, librarian, and writer.
Cont Mhlanga, 64, Zimbabwean playwright, actor, and theatre director.
Ilinka Mitreva, 72, Macedonian politician, minister of foreign affairs (2001, 2002–2006).
Joseph Mondello, 84, American politician and diplomat, ambassador to Trinidad and Tobago (2018–2021).
Hiroshi Ōtake, 90, Japanese voice actor (Perman, The Kabocha Wine, Akira), heart failure.
Sir Michael Pike, 90, British diplomat, ambassador to Vietnam (1982–1985).
Philip Purser, 96, British television critic and novelist.
Andrejs Rubins, 43, Latvian footballer (Skonto, Crystal Palace, national team).
Sarathi, 80, Indian actor (Velugu Needalu, Gandikota Rahasyam, Chanakya Chandragupta) and comedian, kidney disease.
Gary Schroen, 80, American intelligence officer (CIA).
Elaine Schuster, 90, American philanthropist and diplomat, complications from pneumonia.
Pantur Silaban, 84, Indonesian physicist.
Robert E. Simanek, 92, American marine, Medal of Honor recipient (1953).
Lars Tate, 56, American football player (Georgia Bulldogs, Tampa Bay Buccaneers, Chicago Bears), throat cancer.
Hans Weilbächer, 88, German footballer (Eintracht Frankfurt, West Germany national team).
Eugene Wen-chin Wu, 100, Chinese-born American scholar.
Prince Yawson, 52, Ghanaian actor (Obra, Diabolo), stroke.

2
Sarfraz Ali, 59, Pakistani military officer, helicopter crash.
Juan Antonio Arévalo, 87, Spanish politician, senator (1979–2000).
Buddy Arrington, 84, American racing driver (NASCAR).
Melissa Bank, 61, American writer (The Girls' Guide to Hunting and Fishing), lung cancer.
David Bawden, 62, American conclavist, claimant to the papacy (since 1990).
Jan Budkiewicz, 88, Polish publicist, screenwriter, and politician, MP (1993–1997).
Jimmy Burson, 81, American football player (St. Louis Cardinals, Atlanta Falcons).
Luis Augusto Castro Quiroga, 80, Colombian Roman Catholic prelate, apostolic vicar of San Vicente (1986–1998), archbishop of Tunja (1998–2020) and twice president of the CEC, COVID-19.
Jack Deloplaine, 68, American football player (Pittsburgh Steelers, Washington Redskins, Chicago Bears).
Stan Dragland, 79, Canadian writer and editor.
Brenda Fisher, 95, English long-distance swimmer, complications of a stroke.
Friedrich-Wilhelm von Herrmann, 87, German philosopher, Heidegger scholar.
Jerry Holbert, 63, American political cartoonist (Boston Herald).
Joo Don-sik, 85, South Korean politician, minister of culture and sports (1994–1995).
Lucien Kroll, 95, Belgian architect.
Velichko Minekov, 93, Bulgarian sculptor.
Adolfo Navajas Artaza, 97, Argentine businessman and politician, minister of social action (1982–1983) and governor of Corrientes (1969–1973).
Susan Neher, 63, American actress (To Rome with Love, Getting Together).
Jack Netzler, 82, Samoan politician, deputy (1981–2001).
Zbyszko Piwoński, 93, Polish politician, voivode of Zielona Góra (1984–1990) and senator (1993–2005).
Stavros Psycharis, 77, Greek publisher and politician, civil administrator of Mount Athos (1996–2001).
Clayton Ruby, 80, Canadian civil rights lawyer and activist.
Vin Scully, 94, American Hall of Fame sportscaster (Brooklyn/Los Angeles Dodgers).
Nikolay Yefimov, 89, Russian journalist.

3
Yvonne Baby, 90, French journalist and novelist.
Shirley Barrett, 61, Australian film director and screenwriter (Love Serenade), cancer.
Nerijus Bilevicius, 42, Lithuanian convicted murderer (Lisa Holm), stabbed.
Stuart Briscoe, 91, English-born American evangelical author.
Terry Caffery, 73, Canadian ice hockey player (Chicago Blackhawks, Minnesota North Stars).
Mithilesh Chaturvedi, 67, Indian actor (Koi... Mil Gaya, Gadar: Ek Prem Katha, Mohalla Assi), heart attack.
Raymond Damadian, 86, American physician, inventor of magnetic resonance imaging.
Ton Frinking, 91, Dutch politician, MP (1977–1993), state secretary for defence (1993–1994).
Bruce Grant, 97, Australian writer and journalist.
Roy Hackett, 93, Jamaican-British civil rights activist.
Imdaad Hamid, 78, Indonesian politician, mayor of Balikpapan (2001–2011).
Evan Jones, 90, Australian poet.
Olga Kachura, 52, Russian officer, missile strike.
Petro Kravchuk, 60, Ukrainian politician, MP (2006–2008).
Lee Gi-ho, 76, South Korean politician, minister of labor (1997–1999).
Alastair Little, 72, British chef, cookbook author and restaurateur.
Jan Longone, 89, American food historian and writer.
Franz Marijnen, 79, Belgian theatre director.
Ann McGuiness, 65, American reproductive rights advocate, leiomyosarcoma.
Nicky Moore, 75, English singer (Samson), complications from Parkinson's disease.
Ng Boon Bee, 84, Malaysian badminton player, Olympic silver medallist (1972).
Paul X. Rinn, 75, American naval captain.
Abu Saleh, 82, Bangladeshi politician, MP (1971–1973).
Ilya Tsipursky, 87, Russian sambist and judoka.
Villiam Vecchi, 73, Italian footballer (Milan, Como, SPAL).
Jackie Walorski, 58, American politician, member of the U.S. House of Representatives (since 2013) and Indiana House of Representatives (2005–2010), traffic collision.

4
Agustín Drake Aldama, 87, Cuban sculptor.
Thorleif Andresen, 77, Norwegian Olympic cyclist (1968, 1972, 1976).
Auh June-sun, 85, South Korean politician, MP (1996–2000).
Mustafa Adebayo Balogun, 74, Nigerian police officer, inspector general of police (2002–2005).
Neil Castles, 87, American racing driver (NASCAR).
Joanna Clark, 44, English environmental scientist.
Sandy Dillon, 62, American singer-songwriter.
Rodger Doner, 84, Canadian Olympic wrestler (1964).
Johnny Famechon, 77, French-born Australian boxer, WBC featherweight champion (1969–1970).
Daren Gilbert, 58, American football player (New Orleans Saints).
Sam Gooden, 87, American Hall of Fame soul singer (The Impressions).
Santiago Grisolía, 1st Marquess of Grisolía, 99, Spanish biochemist.
Carl Kabat, 88, American Roman Catholic priest and anti-nuclear weapons activist.
Akin Mabogunje, 90, Nigerian geographer, president of the International Geographical Union (1980–1984).
Margaret Maruani, 68, Tunisian-born French sociologist.
Abdel Kader Moukhtatif, 88, Moroccan Olympic footballer (1964).
Edir Oliveira, 72, Brazilian politician, mayor of Gravataí (1993–1997).
Atakhan Pashayev, 84, Azerbaijani civil servant, chairman of the National Archive Department (since 2002).
J. A. O. Preus III, 69, American academic administrator (Concordia University Irvine).
Adriana Roel, 88, Mexican actress (Viva Maria!, Autumn Days, Chucho el Roto).
Ebbe Schön, 92, Swedish folklorist.
Sir Robert Walmsley, 81, British Royal Navy vice admiral, controller of the Navy (1994–1996).
Albert Woodfox, 75, American prisoner (Angola Three), complications from COVID-19.

5
Tom Alberg, 82, American lawyer and businessman, director of Amazon.com (1996–2019).
Ana Luísa Amaral, 66, Portuguese poet.
Diego Bertie, 54, Peruvian singer and actor (Ultra Warrior, Report on Death, Crossing a Shadow), fall.
Robert Brockman, 81, American software executive, CEO of Reynolds and Reynolds.
Dean Carlson, 72, American football player (Kansas City Chiefs, Green Bay Packers).
Jean-Jacques Cassiman, 79, Belgian geneticist.
Reginald Cawcutt, 83, South African Roman Catholic prelate, auxiliary bishop of Cape Town (1992–2002).
John Chandler, 98, American educator, president of Hamilton College (1968–1973) and Williams College (1973–1985).
Judith Durham, 79, Australian singer (The Seekers), lung disease.
Kostja Gatnik, 76, Slovenian children's book illustrator.
Debi Ghosal, 87, Indian politician, MP (1984–1989).
Cherie Gil, 59, Filipino actress (Manila By Night, Oro, Plata, Mata, Bituing Walang Ningning), cancer.
Roberto Gil, 84, Spanish football player (Valencia) and coach.
Clu Gulager, 93, American actor (The Return of the Living Dead, The Tall Man, The Last Picture Show).
Ali Haydar, 90, Syrian military officer.
Tayseer Jabari, 50, Palestinian Islamic militant, military leader of the Palestinian Islamic Jihad (since 2019), airstrike.
Joseph P. Johnson, 90, American politician, member of the Virginia House of Delegates (1966–1970, 1990–2014).
Rudolf Knez, 77, Slovenian Olympic ice hockey player (1968, 1972).
Felix Kolmer, 100, Czech physicist.
Michael Lang, 80, American pianist and composer.
Bob Lay, 78, Australian Olympic sprinter (1964).
Luciano Macías, 87, Ecuadorian footballer (Barcelona, Miami Toros, national team).
Issey Miyake, 84, Japanese fashion designer (L'eau d'Issey), liver cancer.
Aled Owen, 88, Welsh footballer (Tottenham Hotspur, Ipswich Town, Wrexham).
Mark Paterson, 74, New Zealand Olympic sailor (1976).
Caroline Pauwels, 58, Belgian academic administrator, rector of the Vrije Universiteit Brussel (2016–2022), esophageal cancer.
Dillon Quirke, 24, Irish hurler (Tipperary).
Richard Roat, 89, American actor (Days of Our Lives, Generations, The Doctors), heart attack.
Peter Schowtka, 77, German politician, member of the Landtag of Saxony (1991–2014) and mayor of Wittichenau (1990–1994).
Abdul Rahim Shapiee, 45, Singaporean drug smuggler, execution by hanging.
Jô Soares, 84, Brazilian comedian and talk show host (Programa do Jô).
Torgny Söderberg, 77, Swedish songwriter ("100%", "Diggi-Loo Diggi-Ley").
Michael Howard, 21st Earl of Suffolk, 87, British hereditary peer, member of the House of Lords (1957–1999).
Narender Thapa, 58, Indian footballer (Bengal, national team), cardiac arrest.
John Tingle, 90, Australian broadcaster and politician, New South Wales MLC (1995–2006).
Susan Whelchel, 77, American politician, mayor of Boca Raton, Florida (2008–2014).

6
Shinmon Aoki, 85, Japanese writer, lung cancer.
Archie Battersbee, 12, British child, removal of life support.
Carlo Bonomi, 85, Italian voice actor (Pingu, La Linea) and clown.
Steve Courtin, 79, American basketball player (Saint Joseph's Hawks, Philadelphia 76ers).
Hussein Abdo Hamza, 72, Egyptian jurist, president of the State Lawsuits Authority (2017–2019).
Buddy Leach, 88, American politician, member of the U.S. House of Representatives (1979–1981) and Louisiana House of Representatives (1968–1979, 1984–1988).
Raymond Lebreton, 80, French racing cyclist.
Daniel Lévi, 60, French singer-songwriter ("L'envie d'aimer"), colon cancer.
Marilyn Loden, 76, American writer, coined the phrase "glass ceiling", small-cell carcinoma.
Tamo Mibang, 67, Indian academic administrator, vice-chancellor of Rajiv Gandhi University (2012–2018).
John Mulhall, 83, British Olympic gymnast (1960, 1964).
David Muse, 73, American singer, songwriter and composer (Firefall, The Marshall Tucker Band), cancer.
Samu, 81, Korean-Canadian Buddhist monk, Parkinson's disease.
Erich Schönbächler, 86, Swiss Olympic biathlete (1964).
Bob Skelly, 79, Canadian politician, MP (1988–1993).
Boudjemaa Talai, 70, Algerian politician, MP (2017–2019) and transport minister (2015–2017).
Gene Visscher, 81, American college basketball coach (Weber State, Northern Arizona).
Butch Wilkins, 75, American politician, member of the Arkansas House of Representatives (2009–2015), surgical complications.
John Yanta, 90, American Roman Catholic prelate, bishop of Amarillo (1997–2008).

7
Ezekiel Alebua, 75, Solomon Islands politician, prime minister (1986–1989) and MP (1980–1987).
Biyi Bandele, 54, Nigerian novelist, playwright and film director (Elesin Oba, The King's Horseman, Half of a Yellow Sun).
Ernesto Cavour, 82, Bolivian singer (Los Jairas).
Noel Clarke, 91, Australian footballer (Melbourne).
Carl Croneberg, 92, Swedish-American linguist.
Elana Dykewomon, 72, American lesbian rights activist and author. 
Henryk Dziewior, 74, Polish entrepreneur and politician, mayor of Katowice (1994–1998).
Bert Fields, 93, American lawyer (Michael Jackson, The Beatles, Warren Beatty) and author, complications from COVID-19.
Anatoly Filipchenko, 94, Russian cosmonaut (Soyuz 7, Soyuz 16).
Judy Gamin, 92, Australian politician, Queensland MLA (1988–1989, 1992–2001).
Ned Goodman, 85, Canadian businessman (Dundee Corporation).
Bill Graham, 83, Canadian politician, MP (1993–2007), minister of national defence (2004–2006) and foreign affairs (2002–2004). 
Ian Charleson Hedge, 93, Scottish botanist.
Eike Christian Hirsch, 85, German journalist and writer.
Gerd Kaminski, 79, Austrian legal scholar.
Omar Khalid Khorasani, Pakistani Islamic militant, co-founder of the Pakistani Taliban and founder of Jamaat-ul-Ahrar, explosion.
Leandro Lo, 33, Brazilian jiu-jitsu practitioner, shot.
David McCullough, 89, American historian and author (Truman, John Adams), Pulitzer Prize winner (1993, 2002).
Robert Mikhail Moskal, 84, American Ukrainian Greek Catholic hierarch, bishop of Saint Josaphat in Parma (1984–2009).
Roger E. Mosley, 83, American actor (Magnum, P.I., Leadbelly, Terminal Island), injuries sustained in a traffic collision.
Dionysis Simopoulos, 79, Greek astronomer, pancreatic cancer.
Koru Tito, 61, Kiribati Roman Catholic prelate, bishop-elect of Tarawa and Nauru (since 2020).
Yoshifumi Ushima, 55, Japanese singer and composer (Mobile Fighter G Gundam), complications from cirrhosis.
Rostislav Václavíček, 75, Czech footballer (Zbrojovka Brno, K.S.C. Hasselt), Olympic champion (1980).
Shea Zellweger, 96, American semiotician.
Irik Zhdanov, 87, Russian boxing coach.

8
Nathan Boya, 98, American daredevil and medical researcher, first African American to go over Niagara Falls.
John M. Cooper, 82, American philosopher.
Lamont Dozier, 81, American Hall of Fame songwriter ("You Can't Hurry Love", "Reach Out I'll Be There"), record producer (Holland–Dozier–Holland) and singer.
Leo Giacometto, 60, American lieutenant colonel and politician, member of the Montana House of Representatives (1987–1990).
Tom Hedderson, 68, Canadian politician, Newfoundland and Labrador MHA (1999–2015).
Darryl Hunt, 72, English musician (The Pogues).
Per Jansen, 80, Norwegian actor (Ballad of the Masterthief Ole Hoiland, A Commuter Kind of Love, Hud).
Billy Legg, 74, English footballer (Huddersfield Town, Bradford Park Avenue).
Dame Olivia Newton-John, 73, British-Australian singer ("I Honestly Love You", "Physical") and actress (Grease), Grammy winner (1974, 1975, 1982), breast cancer.
Luis Enrique Oberto, 93, Venezuelan politician, member (1979–1999) and president (1990–1994) of the Chamber of Deputies, minister of finance (1972–1974).
Uma Pemmaraju, 64, Indian-American journalist and news anchor (Fox News).
Zofia Posmysz, 98, Polish journalist and author (Passenger).
Vasile Tărâțeanu, 76, Ukrainian writer.
Jozef Tomko, 98, Slovak Roman Catholic cardinal, secretary general of the Synod of Bishops (1979–1985) and prefect for Evangelization of Peoples (1985–2001), complications from a fall.
Ruby Williams, 94, American folk artist and produce vendor.

9
John Abdo, 66, American health and fitness coach, businessman and nutritionist, cancer.
Sir John Banham, 81, British businessman, director of the Confederation of British Industry (1987–1992).
Heinz Behrens, 89, German actor (KLK Calling PTZ – The Red Orchestra, Bürgschaft für ein Jahr, Du bist nicht allein).
Peter B. Bennett, 91, British medical researcher, founder of the Divers Alert Network.
Ken Boles, 89, American politician, member of the Florida House of Representatives (1978–1982).
Charlie Brandon, 78, American football player (Ottawa Rough Riders, Norfolk Neptunes, Winnipeg Blue Bombers).
Raymond Briggs, 88, British children's writer and illustrator (Father Christmas, The Snowman, Fungus the Bogeyman), pneumonia.
William I. Cowin, 84, American judge and politician.
Bernie Crowe, 89, Australian footballer (Geelong).
Dakolé Daïssala, 79, Cameroonian politician, MP (1997–2002, since 2013).
Kieran Denvir, 90, Northern Irish Gaelic footballer (UCD GAA, Down GAA).
Ingemar Erlandsson, 64, Swedish footballer (Malmö FF, national team).
Nicholas Evans, 72, English writer (The Horse Whisperer), heart attack.
Mario Fiorentini, 103, Italian partisan, spy and mathematician, kidney failure.
Della Griffin, 100, American jazz vocalist and drummer.
Jussi Hakulinen, 57, Finnish musician and singer-songwriter.
Zoltán Halász, 62, Hungarian Olympic cyclist (1980).
Mick Jones, 75, English football player (Notts County) and manager (Peterborough United, Plymouth Argyle).
Rudi Koertzen, 73, South African cricket umpire, traffic collision.
Marc Lapadula, 62, American playwright, screenwriter and lecturer (Yale University).
Gene LeBell, 89, American grappling trainer (Ronda Rousey), promoter (NWA Hollywood Wrestling) and stuntman (The Green Hornet).
Luigi Lucherini, 92, Italian politician, mayor of Arezzo (1999–2006).
Donald Machholz, 69, American astronomer, co-inventor of the Messier marathon, COVID-19.
Jane McAdam Freud, 64, British conceptual sculptor.
Ian McCausland, 77–78, Australian artist.
Alberto Orzan, 91, Italian footballer (Udinese, Fiorentina, national team).
Pradeep Patwardhan, 64, Indian actor, heart attack.
Mikalay Slyonkow, 93, Belarusian politician, first secretary of the Communist Party (1983–1987).
Maya Thevar, 87, Indian politician, MP (1973–1984).
Dimitris Tsironis, 62, Greek politician, MP (2007–2012).
Sir Miles Warren, 93, New Zealand architect.

10
João de Almeida Bruno, 87, Portuguese military judge.
Peter Byrne, 86, Irish sportswriter (The Irish Times).
Fernando Chalana, 63, Portuguese football player (Benfica, Bordeaux, national team) and manager.
Lydia de Vega, 57, Filipino Olympic sprinter (1984, 1988), breast cancer.
Kiril Dojčinovski, 78, Macedonian footballer (Vardar Skopje, Red Star Belgrade, Yugoslavia national team).
Hushang Ebtehaj, 94, Iranian poet.
Ben Farrell, 76, American concert promoter.
Leslie Griffith, 66, American journalist (The Denver Post, San Francisco Chronicle) and news anchor (KTVU).
Sir Ralph Halpern, 83, British fashion industry executive, founder of Topshop.
Adel Heinrich, 96, American composer and organist.
Andrew Hubner, 59, American author.
Julian Klymkiw, 89, Canadian ice hockey player (New York Rangers).
Dean S. Laird, 101, American World War II flying ace.
Rosina Lajo, 90, Spanish teacher and politician, deputy (1977–1978).
Pat Liney, 86, Scottish footballer (Dundee, St Mirren, Bradford City).
Vesa-Matti Loiri, 77, Finnish actor (Uuno Turhapuro, The Boys, Sign of the Beast), musician and comedian, cancer.
Eino Oksanen, 91, Finnish Olympic marathon runner (1956, 1960, 1964).
Corky Palmer, 68, American college baseball coach (Southern Miss Golden Eagles).
Helen Potrebenko, 82, Canadian author.
Lawney Reyes, 91, American artist.
Ostap Savka, 75, Ukrainian footballer (Naftovyk Drohobych, Shakhtar Donetsk, Karpaty Lviv).
Jim Thomson, 89, New Zealand cricketer (Wellington).
Robert Deam Tobin, 60, American academic, cancer.
Yi-Fu Tuan, 91, Chinese-American geographer.
Florentina Villalobos Chaparro, 91, Mexican journalist and politician, deputy (1964–1967, 1982–1985).
Karina Vismara, 31, Argentine folk singer-songwriter, cancer and kidney failure.
Kathryn Vonderau, 94, American baseball player (Fort Wayne Daisies, Peoria Redwings).
Abdul Wadud, 75, American cellist.

11
Michael Badnarik, 68, American software engineer, political activist, and radio talk show host, heart failure.
Sir Simon Bland, 98, British soldier and courtier.
Bill Blevin, 92, Australian physicist.
Marco Brown, 94, Jamaican politician, MP (1980–1989), COVID-19.
Darius Campbell Danesh, 41, Scottish singer-songwriter ("Colourblind", "Rushes", "Incredible (What I Meant to Say)"), accidental chloroethane inhalation.
Vahan Chamlian, 96, Armenian-American secondhand clothes dealer and philanthropist.
Jonathan Danilowitz, 77, Israeli flight attendant and LGBT activist, pancreatic cancer.
Terrance Dean, 53, American author (Hiding in Hip Hop), academic and television executive (MTV).
Arthur Goddard, 101, British-Australian engineer (Rover Company).
Paul Green, 49, Australian rugby league player (Cronulla-Sutherland, Queensland) and coach (North Queensland), Rothmans Medal winner (1995), suicide.
J. S. Grewal, 95, Indian historian and academic administrator, vice-chancellor of Guru Nanak Dev University (1981–1984).
Rahimullah Haqqani, Afghan cleric, bombing.
Anne Heche, 53, American actress (Donnie Brasco, Psycho, Another World), Emmy winner (1991), injuries sustained in a traffic collision.
Mohamed Huzam, 52, Maldivian playback singer (Sitee, Hifehettumeh Neiy Karuna, Hinithun).
Hana Mazi Jamnik, 19, Slovenian cross-country skier, traffic collision.
John Kelly, 78, Irish journalist and author.
Colleen Mills, 66, New Zealand management academic.
Yuri Mitev, 64, Bulgarian Olympic biathlete (1980, 1984).
Hanae Mori, 96, Japanese fashion designer.
Manuel Ojeda, 81, Mexican actor (Romancing the Stone, Laberintos de pasión, Alborada).
Baburao Pacharne, 71, Indian politician, Maharashtra MLA (2014–2019), cancer.
Cecile Pineda, 89, American author.
Bill Pitman, 102, American guitarist and session musician (The Wrecking Crew), complications from a fall.
Jean-Jacques Sempé, 89, French cartoonist (Le Petit Nicolas).
Pauline Stroud, 92, British actress (Lady Godiva Rides Again), cancer.
Shimoga Subbanna, 83, Indian playback singer (Kaadu Kudure), cardiac arrest.
Morgan Taylor, 52, American illustrator (Gustafer Yellowgold) and songwriter, sepsis.
David Tomassoni, 69, American politician, member (since 2001) and president (2020–2021) of the Minnesota Senate, Olympic ice hockey player (1984), complications from ALS.
József Tóth, 70, Hungarian footballer (Pécsi Dózsa, Újpesti Dózsa, national team).
Martin James Wilson, 63, New Zealand environmentalist and festival organizer (Birdman Rally), prostate cancer.

12
Don A. Anderson, 88, American politician, member of the Minnesota Senate (1983–1990), and businessman.
Lyle Bradley, 79, Canadian ice hockey player (California Golden Seals, Cleveland Barons).
Richard Caruso, 79, American entrepreneur, founder of Integra LifeSciences.
Nigel Dodd, 57, British sociologist.
Jessica Eriyo, 52, Ugandan social worker, politician and diplomat, MP (2001–2011) and minister of the environment (2006–2011), cancer.
Lillian Frank, 92, Burmese-born Australian hairdresser, philanthropist, and fashion influencer.
Claudio Garella, 67, Italian footballer (Sampdoria, Hellas Verona, Napoli), complications from heart surgery.
Ebrahim Qanbari-Mehr, 94, Iranian musical instrument maker.
Louis Grillot, 90, French farmer and politician, senator (1998–2008).
Anshu Jain, 59, Indian-British banker, co-CEO of Deutsche Bank (2012–2015), duodenal cancer.
Keith Jamieson, 74, Australian country singer.
Eino Kalpala, 96, Finnish Olympic alpine skier (1952).
Motiullah Khan, 84, Pakistani field hockey player, Olympic champion (1960).
Natalia LL, 85, Polish visual artist.
Adèle Milloz, 26, French ski mountaineer, climbing fall.
Togo Palazzi, 90, American basketball player (Boston Celtics, Syracuse Nationals) and coach (Holy Cross Crusaders).
Ricardo Perdomo, 62, Uruguayan football player (Rayo Vallecano, Unión Española) and manager (Miramar Misiones).
José Luis Pérez-Payá, 94, Spanish footballer (Atlético Madrid, Real Madrid, national team).
Wolfgang Petersen, 81, German film director (Das Boot, The NeverEnding Story, Troy), pancreatic cancer.
Dorli Rainey, 95, American political activist (Occupy Seattle).
Helen Rankin, 90, American politician, member of the Maine House of Representatives (2008–2014).
Viacheslav Semenov, 74, Ukrainian footballer (Zorya Voroshilovhrad, Dnipro, Soviet Union national team), Olympic bronze medallist (1972).
Amparín Serrano, 56, Mexican graphic designer.
Ion Solonenco, 87, Moldovan army general.
Virginia Spate, 84, British-born Australian art historian.
Stanley Turkel, 96, American historian and hotel manager.
Diego Uribe Vargas, 90, Colombian politician and diplomat, minister of foreign affairs (1978–1981).
Aharon Yadlin, 96, Israeli educator and politician, MK (1959–1981) and minister of education (1974–1977).
Lewis Jerome Zeigler, 78, Liberian Roman Catholic prelate, bishop of Gbarnga (2002–2009) and archbishop of Monrovia (2009–2021).

13
Piero Angela, 93, Italian television host, science journalist, and writer.
Tadeusz Bartczak, 87, Polish chemist and crystallographer.
Michael W. Berns, 79, American biologist.
Peter S. Bridges, 90, American diplomat, ambassador to Somalia (1984–1986).
Rossana Di Lorenzo, 84, Italian actress (Le coppie, Il comune senso del pudore, Le Bal).
Denise Dowse, 64, American actress (Beverly Hills, 90210, The Guardian, Coach Carter), complications from meningitis.
Robyn Griggs, 49, American actress (One Life to Live, Another World, Zombiegeddon), cervical cancer.
John Chris Jones, 94, Welsh design researcher.
David Kay, 82, American weapons inspector, lead of the Iraq Survey Group, cancer.
Desanka Kovačević-Kojić, 96, Serbian historian.
Maung Paw Tun, 87, Burmese writer, colon cancer.
Antonino Orrù, 94, Italian Roman Catholic prelate, bishop of Ales-Terralba (1990–2004).
Marta Palau Bosch, 88, Spanish-Mexican visual artist.
Claude Salhani, 70, Egyptian photographer.
Ângelo Domingos Salvador, 90, Brazilian Roman Catholic prelate, bishop of Coxim (1986–1991), Cachoeira do Sul (1991–1999) and Uruguaiana (1999–2007).
Sedrak Saroyan, 54, Armenian general and politician, MP (2007–2018).
John Train, 93–94, American investment advisor and writer.
Steve Worster, 73, American football player (Texas Longhorns, Hamilton Tiger-Cats).
Ekaterina Yosifova, 81, Bulgarian educator and poet.

14
Rodolfo Bebán, 84, Argentine actor (Arm in Arm Down the Street, Juan Moreira, Hotel alojamiento).
Kristaq Dhamo, 89, Albanian film director (Tana, Botë e padukshme, Nga mesi i errësirës) and actor.
Robert E. Finnigan, 95, American chemist.
Donald Foss, 78, American businessman, founder of Credit Acceptance, cancer.
Freya, Norwegian walrus, euthanized.
Nina Garsoïan, 99, French-born American Armenologist, dean of Princeton University Graduate School (1977–1979).
Yosiwo George, 81, Micronesian diplomat and politician, governor of Kosrae (1983–1991) and vice president (since 2015), COVID-19.
Stefan Gierowski, 97, Polish painter and avant garde artist.
Déwé Gorodey, 73, New Caledonian writer and politician, vice president  (2001–2009).
Francesc Gras Salas, 101, Spanish ophthalmologist and writer.
Rakesh Jhunjhunwala, 62, Indian investor and stock trader, founder of Akasa Air, complications from diabetes.
George Kernek, 82, American baseball player (St. Louis Cardinals).
Ambrose Lee, 73, Hong Kong politician, secretary for security (2003–2010), commissioner of the ICAC (2002–2003) and director of immigration (1998–2002), complications from a fall.
Arne Legernes, 91, Norwegian footballer (SK Freidig, Larvik Turn, national team).
Egle Martin, 86, Argentine singer, vedette and actress.
Vinayak Mete, 52, Indian politician, Maharashtra MLC (since 2010), traffic collision.
Anastasia Motaung, South African politician, member of the National Assembly (since 2019).
Marshall Napier, 70, New Zealand-born Australian actor (Came a Hot Friday, Police Rescue, McLeod's Daughters), brain cancer.
Svika Pick, 72, Polish-born Israeli singer and songwriter ("Diva").
Dan Rapoport, 52, Soviet-born American investor, fall.
Nafis Sadik, 92, Pakistani civil servant, executive director of UNFPA (1987–2000).
Roger H. Scherer, 87, American politician, member of the Minnesota House of Representatives (1967–1972).
Anthony Simpson, 86, British politician, MEP (1979–1994)
Lawrence Stepelevich, 92, American philosopher.
Butch Thompson, 78, American jazz pianist and clarinetist.
Baltash Tursymbaev, 75, Kazakh politician, minister of agriculture (1992–1993).
Dmitri Vrubel, 62, Russian painter (My God, Help Me to Survive This Deadly Love), complications from COVID-19.

15
Gar Baxter, 92, Canadian football player (Winnipeg Blue Bombers).
Frederick Buechner, 96, American novelist (A Long Day's Dying, Godric) and theologian (Secrets in the Dark).
Mike Burrows, 79, British bicycle designer, cancer.
Pete Carril, 92, American college basketball coach (Reading HS, Lehigh, Princeton).
Jaye Edwards, 103, British pilot.
John Engen, 57, American politician, mayor of Missoula (since 2006), pancreatic cancer.
Tomas Fischer, 81, Swedish businessman and book publisher, drowning.
Steve Grimmett, 62, English heavy metal singer (Grim Reaper, Onslaught, Lionsheart).
Irvin Head, 66, Canadian Indigenous sculptor.
Lenny Johnrose, 52, English footballer (Bury, Blackburn Rovers, Burnley), complications from motor neurone disease.
Sir Raymond Johnstone, 92, Scottish accountant, investment manager and public official.
Barbara Kremen, 100, American writer.
Bob Locker, 84, American baseball player (Chicago White Sox, Oakland Athletics, Chicago Cubs).
Hugo Lusardi, 39, Paraguayan footballer (Club Nacional, Rubio Ñu, Deportivo Capiatá), cancer.
Andrew J. Maloney, 90, American attorney.
Brian O'Connor, 64, American visual artist.
Arthur Vercoe Pedlar, 89, British clown.
Tsuneko Sasamoto, 107, Japanese photojournalist.
Jane Silverthorne, 69, English-born American biologist.
Reiji Suzuki, 93, Japanese politician, governor of Aichi prefecture (1987–1993).
Nur Tabar, 81, Tajik writer and politician, people's deputy (1987–1990).
András Várhelyi, 68, Hungarian journalist and politician, MP (1998–2002).
Rajmund Zieliński, 81, Polish Olympic cyclist (1964, 1968).

16
Eric Boothroyd, 96, English speedway rider.
Duggie Brown, 82, English comedian and actor (Coronation Street, The Final Cut, Kes).
Frank Crowley, 83, Irish politician, TD (1981–1997).
Kal David, 79, American blues guitarist and singer.
Peter Davison, 95, British academic, authority on George Orwell.
Joseph Delaney, 77, British author (Spook's).
Dorothy Harley Eber, 97, British-born Canadian author, pneumonia.
Robert Finn, 100, American mathematician.
Charley Frazier, 83, American football player (Houston Oilers, Boston Patriots).
Mark Girouard, 90, British architectural writer and historian.
Eva-Maria Hagen, 87, German actress (Don't Forget My Little Traudel, Goods for Catalonia, Meine Freundin Sybille).
Billy Hodgson, 86–87, Scottish footballer (Sheffield United, Derby County, York City). (death announced on this date)
Anthony Hunt, 90, British structural engineer.
Matti Lehtinen, 100, Finnish baritone singer.
Peter Lloyd, 101, Australian aviator.
Deanna B. Marcum, 76, American librarian.
Stanisław Masternak, 76, Polish farmer and politician, MP (1993–2001) and starosta of Sandomierz County (2006–2018).
Bruce Montague, 83, English actor (Butterflies, The Link Men, Hollyoaks).
Narayan, 81, Indian novelist (Kocharethi), COVID-19.
Duro Onabule, 82, Nigerian journalist.
Domenico Pace, 98, Italian Olympic fencer (1956).
Rupchand Pal, 85, Indian politician, MP (1980–1984, 1989–2009).
Hans Peterson, 99, Swedish children's author, suicide. 
Alex Polowin, 98, Lithuanian-born Canadian World War II veteran.
Firangiz Rehimbeyli, 62, Azerbaijani singer and actress, heart attack.
Odd Reinsfelt, 80, Norwegian meteorologist and politician, mayor of Bærum (1992–2011).
Rico, 51, Scottish singer-songwriter.
Doug Ross, 70, American college ice hockey player (Bowling Green) and coach (Kent State, Alabama-Huntsville).
Moqut Ruffins, 38, American football player (Louisiana Tech Bulldogs, Bossier–Shreveport Battle Wings, Jacksonville Sharks).
Fedor Shcherbakov, 75, Kazakh military officer, commander-in-chief of the ground forces (1994–2000).
Subhash Singh, 59, Indian politician, Bihar MLA (since 2000), kidney failure.
Wayne Yates, 84, American basketball player (Los Angeles Lakers, Oakland Oaks) and coach (Memphis State Tigers).
Aydın Yelken, 83, Turkish footballer (Fenerbahçe, Karagümrük, national team).
Bachir Yellès, 100, Algerian painter.
Viktor Zozulin, 77, Russian actor (Operation Y and Shurik's Other Adventures, I Loved You, King Stag).

17
Chen Man Hin, 97, Chinese-born Malaysian politician, MP (1969–1990) and Negeri Sembilan MLA (1965–1982).
Sir Toby Curtis, 82, New Zealand educationalist and Māori leader (Te Arawa).
Mabel DeWare, 96, Canadian politician, senator (1990–2001) and New Brunswick MLA (1978–1987).
Hellmut Flashar, 92, German philologist.
Niccolò Ghedini, 62, Italian lawyer and politician, MP (since 2001), leukemia.
Ingvar Gíslason, 96, Icelandic politician, MP (1961–1987) and minister of education (1980–1983).
Earl Michael Irving, 69, American diplomat.
Shigeaki Kato, 75, Japanese politician, member of the House of Representatives (1990–1993).
Robert Kime, 76, British interior decorator and antiques dealer.
Motomu Kiyokawa, 87, Japanese voice actor (Neon Genesis Evangelion, Hellsing, By the Grace of the Gods), pneumonia.
Farid Makari, 74, Lebanese politician, MP (1992–2014), lung cancer.
Jack H. McDonald, 90, American politician, member of the U.S. House of Representatives (1967–1973).
Zdeněk Mraček, 92, Czech neurosurgeon and politician, mayor of Plzeň (1990–1994).
Jim Mueller, 79, American sportscaster (Cleveland Browns).
Mehdi Mujahid, 33–34, Afghan Hazara militia commander (Balkhab uprising), shot.
Maureen Ogden, 93, American politician, member of the New Jersey General Assembly (1982–1996).
Arthur Pound, 92, Australian footballer (Melbourne, Brighton).
Rick Reed, 69, American advertising agent.
James R. Rettig, 71, American librarian, president of the American Library Association (2008–2009).
Sir David Smith, 89, Australian public servant, official secretary to the governor-general (1973–1990).
Michael Tuck, 76, American journalist and news anchor, complications from a stroke.

18
Mislav Bago, 48, Croatian journalist and broadcaster.
Ray Cresp, 93, Australian speedway rider.
Michel Doublet, 82, French politician, senator (1989–2014) and mayor of Trizay (since 1977).
Hadrawi, 79, Somali poet and songwriter.
Clayton Jacobson II, 88, American inventor, developer of the jet ski.
Rolf Kühn, 92, German jazz clarinetist.
Ellen Leonard, 88, Canadian systematic theologian.
István Liptay, 87, Hungarian Olympic basketball player (1960).
Robert Q. Lovett, 95, American film editor (The Taking of Pelham One Two Three, The Cotton Club, A Bronx Tale).
Sombat Metanee, 85, Thai actor (Sugar Is Not Sweet, Tears of the Black Tiger) and politician, MP (2006–2007).
Mari Montegriffo, 72, Gibraltarian politician, MP (1984–2007) and mayor of Gibraltar (1988–1995).
Herbert Mullin, 75, American serial killer.
Rita Ndzanga, 88, South African anti-apartheid activist and politician, MP (1999–2004).
Felix Novikov, 95, Russian architect (Krasnopresnenskaya metro station).
Tom Palmer, 81, American comic book artist (The Tomb of Dracula, Batman, The Avengers).
Virginia Patton, 97, American actress (It's a Wonderful Life, Black Eagle, The Lucky Stiff).
John Powell, 75, American discus thrower, Olympic bronze medalist (1976, 1984).
Milt Ramírez, 72, Puerto Rican baseball player (St. Louis Cardinals, Oakland Athletics).
Josephine Tewson, 91, British actress (Keeping Up Appearances, Last of the Summer Wine, Gabrielle and the Doodleman).

19
Elizabeth Bailey, 83, American economist.
Warren Bernhardt, 83, American jazz pianist (Steps Ahead, Steely Dan).
Chang Ching-hui, 80, Taiwanese politician, MP (2005–2008), pancreatic cancer.
Harold Chapman, 95, British photographer.
Raymonde Dien, 93, French political activist.
Harrison Gray, 80, Canadian ice hockey player (Detroit Red Wings).
Edmund Hein, 82, German economist and politician, member of the Landtag of Saarland (1970–1994).
Tekla Juniewicz, 116, Polish supercentenarian.
Ted Kirkpatrick, 62, American musician (Tourniquet), idiopathic pulmonary fibrosis.
Per Knutsen, 71, Norwegian writer.
Mildred Kornman, 97, American actress (Our Gang) and model. 
Jorge Luis Lona, 86, Argentine Roman Catholic prelate, coadjutor bishop (2000–2001) and bishop (2001–2011) of San Luis.
Michael Malone, 79, American author and television writer  (Another World, One Life to Live).
David Marsh, 88, British amateur golfer and football administrator, chairman of Everton F.C. (1991–1994).
Egon Pajenk, 72, Austrian footballer (SK Rapid Wien, Admira, national team).
Riddick Parker, 49, American football player (Seattle Seahawks, Baltimore Ravens, New England Patriots).
John Tirman, 72, American political theorist, cardiac arrest.
Ivan Vladychenko, 98, Ukrainian trade unionist and politician.
John Wockenfuss, 73, American baseball player (Detroit Tigers, Philadelphia Phillies), complications from dementia.

20
Samar Banerjee, 92, Indian Olympic footballer (1956), COVID-19.
Barry Boehm, 87, American computer scientist and software engineer.
Theodore Bugas, 98, American politician, member of the Oregon House of Representatives (1977–1983), COVID-19.
Civan Canova, 67, Turkish actor (Home Coming, Üç Kuruş, Fatmagül'ün Suçu Ne?), lung cancer.
Jonathan Destin, 27, French writer and anti-bullying activist.
Darya Dugina, 29, Russian political activist, car bombing.
Gail Finney, 63, American politician, member of the Kansas House of Representatives (since 2009).
Séamus Freeman, 78, Irish Roman Catholic prelate, bishop of Ossory (2007–2016).
Pradeep Giri, 77, Nepali politician, MP (1994–1999, since 2018), throat cancer.
Helen Grayco, 97, American singer (The Spike Jones Show) and actress (That Certain Age, A Night at the Opera), cancer.
Bill Haller, 87, American baseball umpire (Major League Baseball).
Audun Heimdal, 25, Norwegian orienteer, cancer.
Kate Holbrook, 50, American historian and writer, eye cancer.
Franz Hummel, 83, German composer and pianist.
Cláudia Jimenez, 63, Brazilian actress and comedienne (O Corpo, Escolinha do Professor Raimundo, Sai de Baixo).
Maurice Kanbar, 93, American entrepreneur and film producer (Hoodwinked!).
Masahiro Kobayashi, 68, Japanese film director (Bashing, The Rebirth, Haru's Journey), cancer.
Jacques Mahéas, 83, French politician, senator (1995–2011) and mayor of Neuilly-sur-Marne (1977–2020).
Marion Mann, 102, American physician and pathologist.
Nayyara Noor, 71, Pakistani playback singer (Aina).
Osthathios Pathros, 58, Indian Syriac Orthodox prelate, metropolitan of Bangalore (since 2006).
Bram Peper, 82, Dutch politician, mayor of Rotterdam (1982–1998) and minister of the interior and kingdom relations (1998–2000).
Syed Sibtey Razi, 83, Indian politician, twice MP, governor of Jharkhand (2004–2009) and Assam (2009), heart disease.
Román Solís Zelaya, 68, Costa Rican jurist, justice of the Supreme Court (since 2001).
Leon Vitali, 74, English actor (Barry Lyndon, Eyes Wide Shut, The Fenn Street Gang).
Tom Weiskopf, 79, American golfer (PGA Tour), pancreatic cancer.
Dean Westlake, 62, American politician, member of the Alaska House of Representatives (2017), beaten.

21
David Armstrong, 67, English footballer (Middlesbrough, Southampton, national team).
Richard S. Cordrey, 88, American politician, member of the Delaware House of Representatives (1971–1973) and senate (1973–1997).
Celia Correas de Zapata, 88, Argentine writer and poet.
E. Bryant Crutchfield, 85, American executive, inventor of the Trapper Keeper, bone cancer.
Oliver Frey, 74, Swiss visual artist.
Vincent Gil, 83, Australian actor (Mad Max, Stone, Prisoner).
Anabel Gutiérrez, 90, Mexican actress (School for Tramps, Little Trapeze Angels) and comedian (Chespirito).
Nikolai Lebedev, 100, Russian actor (Yevdokiya, Eternal Call, Air Crew).
Sela Molisa, 72, Vanuatuan politician, MP (1982–2012) and minister of finance and economic management (2008–2010).
Augustino Mrema, 77, Tanzanian politician, MP (1985–1995, since 2010) and minister of home affairs (1990–1995).
Michael O'Connor, 108, Irish centenarian.
Alexei Panshin, 82, American writer (Rite of Passage, The World Beyond the Hill) and science fiction critic.
Zalo Reyes, 69, Chilean singer, complications from diabetes.
Jamey Rootes, 55, American sports executive (Houston Texans, Columbus Crew).
Peter Stone, 67, Australian soccer player (Western Suburbs, APIA Leichhardt, national team).
Monnette Sudler, 70, American jazz guitarist.
Hüseyin Sungur, 90–91, Turkish politician, member of the Grand National Assembly (1973–1977).
Donald C. Thompson, 91, American vice admiral.
Irvin Warrican, 56, Vincentian cricketer (Windward Islands).
Robert Williams, 72, Greek composer and singer.

22
Jerry Allison, 82, American Hall of Fame drummer (The Crickets) and songwriter ("That'll Be the Day", "Peggy Sue").
Edmund Borowski, 77, Polish sprinter.
Jaimie Branch, 39, American jazz trumpeter and composer.
Shalom Cohen, 91, Israeli rabbi, rosh yeshiva of Porat Yosef Yeshiva (since 1966).
Adnan Coker, 94, Turkish painter.
Kay Dalton, 90, American football coach (Kansas City Chiefs, Denver Broncos, Montreal Alouettes).
David Douglas-Home, 15th Earl of Home, 78, British businessman and hereditary peer, member of the House of Lords (since 1996).
Manouchehr Esmaeili, 83, Iranian voice actor.
Gary Gaines, 73, American football coach (Abilene Christian, Permian), subject of Friday Night Lights, complications from Alzheimer's disease.
Rahimuddin Khan, 96, Pakistani military officer, Chairman Joint Chiefs of Staff Committee (1984–1987), governor of Balochistan (1978–1984) and Sindh (1988).
Fred Lyon, 97, American photographer.
Katinka Mann, 97, American artist and sculptor.
Héctor Moni, 86, Argentine Olympic rower (1960).
Tycho Q. Mrsich, 96, German Egyptologist.
György Pásztor, 99, Hungarian Hall of Fame ice hockey player (Budapesti Korcsolyázó Egylet, Csepel, national team) and executive.
Jiří Pechar, 93, Czech philosopher, translator and literary critic.
Erkki Pulliainen, 84, Finnish biologist and politician, MP (1987–2011).
Abdul Halim Abdul Rahman, 82, Malaysian politician, MP (2004–2013).
Theo Sommer, 92, German newspaper editor (Die Zeit) and intellectual.
Mohamed Sourour, 82, Moroccan Olympic boxer (1968, 1972).
António de Sousa Braga, 81, Portuguese Roman Catholic prelate, bishop of Angra (1996–2016).
Fredy Studer, 74, Swiss drummer.
Creed Taylor, 93, American jazz trumpeter and record producer, founder of Impulse! Records and CTI Records.
Margaret Urlich, 57, New Zealand singer ("Escaping", "Number One (Remember When We Danced All Night)", "Boy in the Moon"), cancer.
Gérard Vignoble, 76, French technician and politician, MP (1988–1997, 2002–2007).
Rembert Weakland, 95, American Roman Catholic prelate, archbishop of Milwaukee (1977–2002).

23
Gino Cogliandro, 72, Italian actor (Joan Lui, Italian Fast Food, Fantozzi 2000 – La clonazione) and stand-up comedian.
Rolando Cubela Secades, 89, Cuban revolutionary, co-founder of the Directorio Revolucionario Estudiantil.
Barbara Cunningham, 96, Australian Olympic gymnast (1956).
Sandra Deal, 80, American education advocate, first lady of Georgia (2011–2019), breast cancer.
Božidar Delić, 66, Serbian military officer and politician, vice president of the National Assembly (2007–2012, since 2022).
William Doe, 81, Australian gastroenterologist and professor of medicine.
Carlos Duarte, 89, Portuguese footballer (Porto, national team).
Steven Hoffenberg, 77, American businessman (Towers Financial Corporation) and convicted fraudster, owner of the New York Post (1993). (body discovered on this date)
Esther Cooper Jackson, 105, American civil rights activist and social worker.
Kim Jong-hwan, 98, South Korean military officer and politician, minister of the interior (1979–1980).
Larry Laudan, 80, American philosopher.
Luiz Mancilha Vilela, 80, Brazilian Roman Catholic prelate, bishop of Cachoeiro de Itapemirim (1985–2002) and archbishop of Vitória (2002–2018).
Vytjie Mentor, 58, South African politician, MP (2002–2014).
Ruslan Panteleymonov, 39, Ukrainian-born British artistic gymnast.
Nigel Paul, 89, English cricketer (Warwickshire).
Sonali Phogat, 42, Indian politician. 
Lev Pitaevskii, 89, Russian theoretical physicist (Gross–Pitaevskii equation).
Gerald Potterton, 91, British-Canadian animator and film director (Heavy Metal, Yellow Submarine, The Smoggies).
Julian Robertson, 90, American hedge fund manager and philanthropist, founder of Tiger Management.
David Shaw, 71, British politician, MP (1987–1997).
Winston Stona, 82, Jamaican actor (The Harder They Come, Cool Runnings, One Love) and businessman.
S. V. Venugopan Nair, 77, Indian writer.
José Vivas, 94, Venezuelan architect.

24
Hérard Abraham, 82, Haitian military officer and politician, acting president (1990), commander-in-chief of the armed forces (1990–1991) and twice minister of foreign affairs.
Len Dawson, 87, American Hall of Fame football player (Pittsburgh Steelers, Dallas Texans/Kansas City Chiefs) and broadcaster (Inside the NFL).
Orlando de la Torre, 78, Peruvian footballer (Sporting Cristal, national team).
Jorge Domínguez, 77, Argentine politician, minister of defense (1996–1999) and mayor of Buenos Aires (1994–1996), pneumonia.
Charlie Finch, 68, American art critic, suicide by jumping.
Charlie Ford, 73, American football player (Chicago Bears, Philadelphia Eagles, Buffalo Bills).
Kazuo Inamori, 90, Japanese entrepreneur, founder of Kyocera and KDDI and chairman of Japan Airlines (since 2010).
Paul Knox, 88, Canadian ice hockey player (Toronto Maple Leafs), Olympic bronze medalist (1956).
Aram Kocharyan, 68, Armenian politician, governor of Lori Province (2006–2011).
Man of the Hole, 60s, Brazilian indigenous person. (body discovered on this date)
Nicola Materazzi, 83, Italian mechanical engineer (Ferrari 288 GTO, Ferrari F40, Bugatti EB 110).
Tim Page, 78, English photographer, liver cancer.
Lily Renée, 101, Austrian-born American comic book artist.
William Reynolds, 90, American actor (The F.B.I., The Gallant Men, The Islanders), pneumonia.
Mahbub Talukdar, 80, Bangladeshi poet and civil servant, election commissioner (2017–2022), cancer.
Joe E. Tata, 85, American actor (Beverly Hills, 90210, Unholy Rollers, The Rockford Files), complications from Alzheimer's disease.
Kallistos Ware, 87, English Orthodox prelate and theologian, metropolitan of Dioclea in Phrygia (since 2007).
Zhu Xiangzhong, 89, Chinese diplomat, ambassador to Peru (1988–1990) and Chile (1990–1995).

25
Devidhan Besra, 77, Indian politician, Bihar MLA (1980–1990), Jharkhand MLA (2000–2005) and MP (2009–2014).
Kimmo Blom, 52, Finnish singer (Raskasta Joulua), cancer. (death announced on this date)
Ronald Crimm, 87, American politician, member of the Kentucky House of Representatives (1996–2017).
Justo de las Cuevas, 90, Spanish politician, deputy (1977–1982), president of the Cantabrian parliament (1972–1982).
Joey DeFrancesco, 51, American jazz musician.
Inez Foxx, 84, American R&B singer ("Mockingbird").
Ken Frailing, 74, American baseball player (Chicago Cubs, Chicago White Sox).
Graziella Galvani, 91, Italian actress (Shivers in Summer, Seduction, Miracles Still Happen). 
Enzo Garinei, 96, Italian actor (Toto, Peppino and the Fanatics, No, the Case Is Happily Resolved, Banana Joe).
Stephen Glasser, 79, American publisher, founder of the Legal Times.
Patsy Gormley, 88, Northern Irish Gaelic footballer (Claudy).
Kurt Gottfried, 93, Austrian-born American physicist, co-founder of the Union of Concerned Scientists.
Fermín Hontou, 65, Uruguayan cartoonist and illustrator.
Ron Hutcherson, 79, American racing driver (NASCAR, ARCA).
Mable John, 91, American R&B singer ("Your Good Thing (Is About to End)").
Ken Jones, 81, Welsh rugby union player (Llanelli, Cardiff, national team).
Roger Jouet, 77, French writer and politician, member of the Regional Council of Normandy (1986–1992) and mayor of Trévières (1971–1994).
Dale Joseph Melczek, 83, American Roman Catholic prelate, auxiliary bishop of Detroit (1983–1992) and bishop of Gary (1996–2014).
Nel Noddings, 93, American feminist, educator, and philosopher.
Giles Radice, Baron Radice, 85, British politician, MP (1973–2001) and member of the House of Lords (2001–2022), cancer.
Radovan Radović, 86, Serbian basketball player (BSK, Kartizan, 1960 Yugoslav Olympic team) and coach.
John Mercer Reid, 85, Canadian politician, MP (1965–1984), cancer.
Richard Setlowe, 89, American author and journalist.
Andrei Slavnov, 82, Russian theoretical physicist (Slavnov–Taylor identities).
Saawan Kumar Tak, 86, Indian film director (Saajan Bina Suhagan, Souten, Sanam Bewafa), producer and lyricist, lung disease.
Orval Tessier, 89, Canadian ice hockey player (Boston Bruins, Montreal Canadiens) and coach (Chicago Blackhawks).
Elly Tumwine, 68, Ugandan military officer and politician, MP (since 1986).
Herman Vanspringel, 79, Belgian road racing cyclist.

26
Joel Baillargeon, 57, Canadian ice hockey player (Winnipeg Jets, Quebec Nordiques), fall.
Luke Bell, 32, American country singer-songwriter, fentanyl intoxication.
Dame Valerie Beral, 76, Australian-born British epidemiologist (Million Women Study).
Tony Berry, 81, British businessman, founder of Blue Arrow.
Charlie Brown, 86, American basketball player (Seattle Chieftains).
Pete Burnside, 92, American baseball player (New York / San Francisco Giants, Washington Senators, Detroit Tigers).
Ronald J. Glasser, 83, American physician and author.
Albert J. Herberger, 91, American vice admiral.
Daikichi Ishibashi, 90, Japanese politician, member of the House of Representatives (1986–2000).
William V. McBride, 100, American Air Force general, vice chief of staff (1975–1978).
Jože Mencinger, 81, Slovenian lawyer, economist and politician.
Roland Mesnier, 78, French-born American chef and author, White House executive pastry chef (1980–2004), complications from cancer.
Aldo Mirate, 79, Italian politician, deputy (1972–1979).
Espen Skjønberg, 98, Norwegian actor (One Day in the Life of Ivan Denisovich, A Handful of Time, The Last Lieutenant).
Amy Stechler, 67, American filmmaker.
Paul Tauer, 86, American politician, mayor of Aurora, Colorado (1987–2003). (death announced on this date)
Jalaluddin Umri, 87, Indian Islamic scholar, amir of Jamaat-e-Islami Hind (2007–2019).
Judy Valentine, 99, American singer and children's television actress.
Slavko Večerin, 65, Serbian Roman Catholic prelate, bishop of Subotica (since 2020).
Wang Weiqi, 83, Chinese biomedician, member of the Chinese Academy of Engineering.
Sue Wills, 77, Australian academic and activist, co-founder of the Campaign Against Moral Persecution.
Hana Zagorová, 75, Czech singer-songwriter and actress (The Hit, Hrubeš a Mareš jsou kamarádi do deště).

27
Dave Bailey, 77, Canadian Olympic runner (1968).
Iulian-Gabriel Bîrsan, 65, Romanian engineer and politician, deputy (2004).
Tadeusz Ferenc, 82, Polish economist and politician, deputy (2001–2002) and mayor of Rzeszów (2002–2021).
Kenneth Foulkes, 78, English rugby league player (Castleford, Hull).
Imdad Hussaini, 82, Pakistani writer and poet.
William A. Jenkins, 104, American coast guard rear admiral, COVID-19 and pneumonia.
Gavin Jones, 81, Australian demographer.
Suleiman Kangangi, 33, Kenyan racing cyclist, traffic collision.
Karl Lamers, 86, German politician, MP (1980–2002).
Robert LuPone, 76, American actor (Jesus Christ Superstar, The Sopranos, A Chorus Line), pancreatic cancer.
Amanda Mackey, 70, American casting director (The Fugitive, A League of Their Own, The Hunt for Red October), myelodysplastic syndrome.
Leslie Megahey, 77, British television producer, director and writer.
Robert Mitchell, 50, British Olympic speed skater (1998).
Tony Nelson, 92, Welsh footballer (Newport County, Bournemouth).
Vicenç Pagès, 58, Spanish writer and literary critic, cancer.
Mogens Palle, 88, Danish Hall of Fame boxing promoter and manager, melanoma.
Georges Al Rassi, 42, Lebanese singer, traffic collision.
Manolo Sanlúcar, 78, Spanish flamenco composer and guitarist.
Theodor Heinrich Schiebler, 99, German anatomist.
Milutin Šoškić, 84, Serbian football player (Partizan, Yugoslavia national team) and manager (OFK Beograd), Olympic champion (1960).
Ferenc Stámusz, 88, Hungarian Olympic racing cyclist (1960, 1964).
Emilio Trivini, 84, Italian rower, Olympic silver medallist (1964).
Horst Vetter, 94, German politician, member of the Abgeordnetenhaus of Berlin (1971–1986).

28
Stefan Arczyński, 106, German-born Polish photographer.
Mary A. Bomar, 78, English-born American government official, director of the National Park Service (2006–2009).
Gil Cawood, 82, New Zealand Olympic rower (1968), world championship bronze medallist (1970).
Bicky Chakraborty, 79, Indian-born Swedish businessman.
Vincent Cheng, 74, Hong Kong banker, MLC (1991–1995) and chairman of HSBC (2005–2010).
Sammy Chung, 90, English football player (Norwich City, Watford) and manager (Doncaster Rovers).
Ralph Eggleston, 56, American animator (The Lion King, WALL·E) and film director (For the Birds), Oscar winner (2001).
Saroj Kumari Gaurihar, 93, Indian writer and politician, Madhya Pradesh MLA (1967–1972).
Fu Kuiqing, 101, Chinese military officer, political commissar of the Nanjing Military Region (1985–1990).
Roger-Claude Guignard, 87, Swiss Olympic sailor (1980).
Manzoor Hussain, 63, Pakistani field hockey player, Olympic champion (1984).
Kamen Kostadinov, 51, Bulgarian politician, MP (2005–2009).
Oleksii Kovalov, 33, Ukrainian politician, deputy (since 2019), shot.
Gastone Simoni, 85, Italian Roman Catholic prelate, bishop of Prato (1992–2012).
Michael D. Smigiel Sr., 64, American politician, member of the Maryland House of Delegates (2003–2015), heart disease.
Ken Van Heekeren, Australian rugby league player (Eastern Suburbs). (death announced on this date)
Frank Webb, 94, American watercolor painter.
Tucker Wiard, 80, American television editor (Murphy Brown, The Carol Burnett Show, Alice), five-time Emmy winner, complications from heart failure.
John Baptist Ye Ronghua, 91, Chinese Roman Catholic prelate, bishop of Xing'anfu (since 2000).
Peter Stephan Zurbriggen, 79, Swiss Roman Catholic archbishop, apostolic nuncio to Austria (2009–2018).

29
Mick Bates, 74, Welsh politician, AM (1999–2011), cancer.
Paul-Marie Cao Ðình Thuyên, 95, Vietnamese Roman Catholic prelate, bishop of Vinh (1992–2010).
Charlbi Dean, 32, South African actress (Triangle of Sadness, Spud, Black Lightning) and model, sepsis.
Patrick B. Gillespie, 76, American politician, member of the Pennsylvania House of Representatives (1975–1978).
Sam Glucksberg, 89, Canadian psychologist.
Vladimir Gusev, 90, Russian politician, deputy (1994–2000), senator (2001–2012) and deputy premier (1985–1990).
Gwendolyn Midlo Hall, 93, American historian.
Pat McGeer, 95, Canadian physician, Olympic basketball player (1948) and politician, British Columbia MLA (1962–1986).
Vince McNeice, 83, English footballer (Watford).
Pradip Mukherjee, 76, Indian actor (Jana Aranya, Dooratwa, Utsab), pneumonia.
Craig Powell, 81, Australian poet.
Jai Ram Reddy, 85, Fijian politician, MP (1972–1987, 1992–1999), attorney-general (1987) and twice president of the court of appeal.
Rigoberto Riasco, 69, Panamanian boxer, WBC super bantamweight champion (1976).
Ron de Roode, 57, Dutch footballer (Den Haag).
Wafiq al-Samarrai, 75, Iraqi intelligence officer, director of general military intelligence (1990–1991), cancer.
Abhijit Sen, 72, Indian economist, member of the planning commission (2004–2014), heart attack.
Melvin Sokolsky, 88, American photographer and film director. 
Hans-Christian Ströbele, 83, German lawyer and politician, MP (1985–1987, 1998–2017).
John P. Varkey, 52, Indian guitarist (Avial) and composer (Frozen).
Ernie Zampese, 86, American football coach (San Diego Chargers, San Diego State Aztecs).

30
Michael Adams, 88, British Royal Air Force officer.
Gheorghe Berceanu, 72, Romanian wrestler, Olympic champion (1972).
Eve Borsook, 92, Canadian-born American art historian, teacher and author.
Thomas Carney, 82, English-American mixologist.
Sir Graeme Davies, 85, New Zealand engineer, academic and administrator.
Eddie Deerfield, 99, American government official and World War II veteran.
Karel Eykman, 86, Dutch children's book writer.
Irwin Glusker, 98, American art director.
Mikhail Gorbachev, 91, Russian politician, final general secretary of the Communist Party (1985–1991) and president of the Soviet Union (1990–1991), Nobel Prize laureate (1990).
Francesc Granell, 78, Spanish economist and academic, cardiac arrest.
Elizabeth Gunn, 95, American mystery author.
Fauziyya Hassan, 80, Maldivian actress (Emme Fahu Dhuvas, Umurah, Hiyy Halaaku).
Brian Herbinson, 91, Northern Irish-born Canadian equestrian, Olympic bronze medallist (1956).
Jaak Kangilaski, 82, Estonian art historian.
Ruth Lapide, 93, German theologian and historian.
Don L. Lind, 92, American astronaut.
Liu Shunsong, 69, Taiwanese politician, member of the Miaoli County Council (since 2014), COVID-19.
Ron Logan, 84, American entertainment executive  (Walt Disney Entertainment).
Tadeusz Myler, 73, Polish politician, deputy (2001–2005).
Bob Russell, 91, Canadian politician.
Arthur Secunda, 94, American painter and sculptor.
Michael Slocombe, 81, English footballer (Welton Rovers, Bristol Rovers, Bath City).
Steve White, 48, American football player (Tampa Bay Buccaneers, New York Jets) and blogger (SB Nation), leukemia.
George Woods, 79, American shot putter, Olympic silver medalist (1968, 1972).

31
Kadyr Baikenov, 77, Kazakh politician, minister of energy and fuel resources (1992–1994).
Bang Young-ung, 80, South Korean novelist.
Lorraine Botha, 57, South African politician, Western Cape MPP (since 2014), heart attack.
Normand Chaurette, 68, Canadian playwright.
Richard Cook, 68-69, American system safety researcher and physician.
Allan Hawke, 74, Australian public servant, chief of staff to the prime minister (1993–1996), high commissioner to New Zealand (2003–2005) and chancellor of  ANU (2006–2008), cancer.
Klaudia Hornung, 60, German Olympic rower (1984).
Alexander Horváth, 83, Slovak football player (MŠK Žilina, Slovan Bratislava) and manager (R.W.D. Molenbeek).
Zeno Karcz, 87, Canadian football player (Hamilton Tiger-Cats).
Domingo Liotta, 97, Argentine heart surgeon.
Francesco Manganelli, 79, Italian politician, deputy (1994–1996), and writer.
Sir Francis McWilliams, 96, Scottish engineer, lord mayor of London (1992–1993).
Mary Noel Menezes, 92, Guyanese historian.
Mark Shreeve, 65, British electronic music composer (Redshift) and songwriter ("Touch Me (I Want Your Body)").
Lee Thomas, 86, American baseball player (Boston Red Sox, Los Angeles Angels) and executive (Philadelphia Phillies).
Bill Turnbull, 66, British journalist and presenter (BBC Breakfast, Songs of Praise, Think Tank), prostate cancer.
Charles Wilson, 87, Scottish journalist and newspaper editor (The Times, The Independent), blood cancer.
David Young, 73, English musician (John Cale, Element of Crime).

References

2022-8
8